Barbar Qaleh (also Romanized as Barbar Qal‘eh; also known as Qal‘eh Barbar) is a village in Kongor Rural District, in the Central District of Kalaleh County, Golestan Province, Iran. At the 2006 census, its population was 935, in 214 families.

References 

Populated places in Kalaleh County